Cornelius Welles Pendleton (January 4, 1859 - September 17, 1936), was a Republican politician from California who served in the California State Assembly, also serving as Speaker of the Assembly and later served in the state Senate.

Life 
Pendleton was born in Brooklyn in 1859, and attended Brown University, graduating in 1881. He later studied law and taught school in Salinas, California. He was admitted to the California bar in 1884 and practiced for a year in San Francisco, where he was also married, before moving to Los Angeles.

He was elected to the California State Assembly from the 74th district in 1892 and served as Speaker in 1901. He was elected to the California State Senate in 1902, serving for 2 years. Pendleton was then appointed the U. S. Collector of Customs for the District of Los Angeles in 1906.

Pendleton died on September 17, 1936, in Los Angeles.

References 

1859 births
1936 deaths
Speakers of the California State Assembly